Rashawn is a given name. Notable people with the given name include:

Rashawn Dally (born 1997), Jamaican-American footballer player
Rashawn Jackson (born 1987), American football player
Rashawn McCarthy (born 1989), Filipino-American basketball player
Rashawn Ray, American sociologist
Rashawn Ross (born 1979), American trumpeter and arranger
Rashawn Scott (born 1992), American football player
Rashawn Slater (born 1999), American football player
Rashawn Thomas (born 1994), American basketball player

See also
Rashan (given name)
Rashaan, given name
Rashaun, given name